Alexis Panselinos (born 1943 in Athens, Greece) is a Greek novelist and translator. He is the son of Assimakis Panselinos (1903-1984) an author and poet and Ephie Pliatsika-Panselinos (1907-1997) also a poet and a novelist. He read Law at the University of Athens and worked as a practicing lawyer. He is a resident of Athens, married to novelist Lucy Dervis. His first book, a collection of four stories, appeared in 1982. In 1986 he published his first novel, 'The Great Procession" (Η Μεγάλη Πομπή) which obtained a Novel State Prize. In 1997 he was the Greek candidate for the European Literary Award (Aristeion) with his third novel, 'Zaida or the Camel in the Snow' (Ζαΐδα ή Η καμήλα στα χιόνια). Many of his books have been translated into Italian, German, English, and Polish. Panselinos has also translated novels from English and German.

Works

Novels
Η Μεγάλη Πομπή (The Great Procession), 1985
Βραδυές μπαλέτου (Ballet nights), 1991
Ζαΐδα ή Η καμήλα στα χιόνια (Zaide or The camel in the snow), 1996
Ο Κουτσός άγγελος (The Lame Angel), 2002
Σκοτεινές επιγραφές (The Dark Inscriptions), 2011
Η κρυφή πόρτα (The secret door), 2016
Ελαφρά ελληνικά τραγούδια (Greek light songs), 2018

Short fiction
Ιστορίες με σκύλους (Dog stories), 1982
Τέσσερις Ελληνικοί Φόνοι (Four Greek Murders) 2004

Non-fiction
Δοκιμαστικές πτήσεις (Test flights), 1993
Mία λέξη χίλιες εικόνες (One Word A Thousand Pictures), 2004

Translated works
Betsy Lost (transl. Caroline Harbouri) Kedros Publications, Athens
La Grande Procession (transl. Henri Tonnet) Les Editions du Griot, Paris
La Grande processione (transl. Maurizio De Rosa) Crocetti Editore, Milano
Zaide ou Le chameau dans la neige (transl. Henri Tonnet) Gallimard, Paris
Zaide oder das Kammel in der Schnee (transl. Theo Votsos) Berlin Verlag, Berlin
Zaida (transl. Mario Cazzulo) Crocetti Editore, Milano
Tajemnicze inskrypcje (The Dark Inscriptions) (transl. Alicja Biadun) Kziazkowe Klimaty, Wroclaw

Translations
Hope, Anthony, Ο αιχμάλωτος της Ζέντα (The Prisoner of Zenda), 1988
Mörike, Eduard,Ο Μότσαρτ στον δρόμο για την Πράγα (Mozart auf der Reise nach Prag), 1996
Barth, John, Ο Βλακοχορτοφάγος (The Sot-Weed Factor), 1999
Harbouri, Caroline Petrie, Φιλάδελφος (The Brothers Carburi), 2002

Awards
 2nd State Prize for his novel The Great Procession in 1986
 Novel Prize of the 'Diavazo' Magazine for his novel The Dark Inscriptions in 2012
 The Greek Candidacy for the European Literary Prize (Aristeion) with his novel Zaida or The Camel in the Snow in 1997
 Novel Prize of the Athens Academy (K. & E. Ouranis Foundation) for his novel Light Greek Songs in 2018
 The Great Award for Life Achievement by the literary magazine O Anagnostis (The Reader) in 2020

External links
A page dedicated to his work (Greek) ( ( 2009-10-25) and (English) ( ( 2009-10-25).
His entry for the 2001 Frankfurt Book Fair (Greek)
His page at Ithaca Online
His page at the website of the Hellenic Authors' Society (Greek) and (English)

Notes

1943 births
Living people
Writers from Athens
National and Kapodistrian University of Athens alumni
Greek novelists